is a Japanese former cyclist. He competed in the road race at the 1988 Summer Olympics. He is currently general manager of the Bridgestone–Anchor cycling team.

References

1963 births
Living people
Japanese male cyclists
Olympic cyclists of Japan
Cyclists at the 1988 Summer Olympics
Sportspeople from Fukushima Prefecture